Cherubim and Seraphim Church of Zion is a Christian denomination from Nigeria. It was founded by Elisha Ilene Ogunfeyimi in 1948. Its headquarters is in Ugbonla.

See also 
 Christianity in Nigeria
 Cherubim and Seraphim Society
 Eternal Sacred Order of Cherubim and Seraphim
 Cherubim and Seraphim (Nigerian Church)

References 

African initiated churches
Churches in Nigeria
Christian organizations established in 1948
1948 establishments in Nigeria